Mitchell Perry Lund (born 13 June 1996) is an English footballer who plays as a right back for Bradford (Park Avenue).

Career

Doncaster Rovers
After coming through Doncaster Rovers's youth system, he signed his first professional contract in May 2014. He made his official début on 7 October 2014 in a 3–0 away victory over Burton Albion in the Football League Trophy, in which he was a member of the starting line-up.

Wrexham
On 1 February 2017, Lund joined Wrexham on an initial one-month loan deal. He was signed in order to provide cover for James Jennings who was due to face an FAW disciplinary panel over a clash during a match against Chester and was expected to receive a ban. However, the panel was delayed, which led manager Dean Keates to allow Lund to return to Doncaster, having made 4 appearances for the side, in order to hand opportunities to youth players.

Morecambe

On 3 July 2017, Lund signed for Morecambe on a season-long loan.

Career statistics

References

External links

Club profile at Doncaster Rovers F.C.

1996 births
Living people
People from Kippax, West Yorkshire
People educated at Garforth Academy
Footballers from Leeds
English footballers
Association football defenders
Doncaster Rovers F.C. players
Wrexham A.F.C. players
Morecambe F.C. players
Bradford (Park Avenue) A.F.C. players
English Football League players